George Kellogg (3 Mar 1803 – 14 May 1876) was the sixth and final superintendent of the Dahlonega Mint. He became the sixth superintendent of the Dahlonega Mint in 1860 and remained in the position until 1861, when the mint was closed because of the American Civil War.

References

External links
Dahlonega, A Brief History, by Anne Amerson
"A BRIEF HISTORY OF THE UNITED STATES BRANCH MINT AT DAHLONEGA, GEORGIA", by Carl N. Lester

Mints of the United States
1803 births
1876 deaths